Al-Fatihin was a magazine in the Indonesian language published by the Islamic State and released by AlFurat Media Center.

See also 

 Dabiq (magazine)
 Rumiyah (magazine)

References 

Defunct political magazines
Irregularly published magazines
Islamic magazines
Islamic State of Iraq and the Levant and Russia
Magazines disestablished in 2017
Magazines established in 2016
News magazines published in Asia
Online magazines

Indonesian-language magazines
Defunct magazines published in Indonesia